Your Mom's House is a comedy podcast hosted by married comedians Tom Segura and Christina Pazsitzky. The podcast was started in 2010 and covers a wide range of topics such as ongoing events, comedy, and the daily life of the two co-hosts—interspersed with toilet humor, running jokes, and commentary on unusual or shocking internet videos. The comedians typically stay away from political discussions, and the majority of their guests are fellow comedians. Additionally YMH Studios produces a number of podcasts on their network, including “2 Bears 1 Cave,” “Dr. Drew After Dark,”  and “The Danny Brown Show.” Starting in 2020, YMH studios began producing live pay-per-view events that can be rented on their website.

History
Segura and Pazsitzky originally started the podcast through the Deathsquad Network, and produced by Brian Redban. Segura and Pazsitzky mentioned in a 2014 Vice article that Joe Rogan had encouraged them to start a podcast. After 40 episodes they started producing the show themselves with the help of producer Nadav Itzkowitz.

In 2012, Your Mom's House was chosen as a finalist in the Best Comedy category at the first annual Stitcher Awards, along with Smodcast, The Adam Carolla Show, The Joe Rogan Experience, The Nerdist, and WTF with Marc Maron.

YMH Studios has also produced a number of other podcasts, including 2 Bears 1 Cave (hosted by Segura and Bert Kreischer), Dr. Drew After Dark (hosted by Drew Pinsky), Where My Mom's At (hosted by Pazsitzky), The Danny Brown Show (hosted by Danny Brown), Tom Segura en Español (a Spanish podcast hosted by Segura), and Tom Talks (a solo, interview driven podcast with Segura). The HoneyDew (hosted by Ryan Sickler) was previously produced at YMH Studios before separating in summer 2020. Beginning in fall of 2020 the studio began the new podcast Roach Motel hosted by Josh Potter, however this show was quickly re-named The Josh Potter Show after only seven episodes due to a copyright dispute. In January of 2023 Segura and Pazsitzky announced a new show on YMH Studios' network hosted by Rob Iler and Jamie-Lynn Sigler of The Sopranos and the Pajama Pants podcast.

During the COVID-19 pandemic, YMH Studios began producing live, pay-per-view shows beginning with Your Mom's House Live & Uncensored on August 14, 2020. As of 2022 the studio has produced three live shows for 2 Bears 1 Cave (including a Big Game event with NFL Hall of Famer Warren Sapp), and nine for Your Mom's House. In late 2021, YMH Studios moved from Los Angeles, to Austin, Texas.

Guests
Episodes often feature prominent guests from the world of entertainment and pop culture, notably fellow stand-up comedians such as Ari Shaffir, Joe Rogan, Andrew Santino, Tom Papa, Josh Wolf, Chad Daniels, Stavros Halkias, Robert Kelly, Louis CK, Bobby Lee, and Andrew Schulz. Johnny Pemberton had made multiple appearances and regularly contributes graphics to the show.

The show has branched out to non-comedian guests including musical artists like Big Daddy Kane, Brendon Urie, and Too Short; actors including Rob Iler, Jamie-Lynn Sigler, Alyssa Milano, and Elizabeth Lail; celebrity personalities like Cesar Millan and Rhett & Link, and adult actresses Alexis Fawx and Kate Kennedy. In late 2022, director Kevin Smith appeared as a guest, where he defended posting photos of his reaction to Black Panther: Wakanda Forever.

2 Bears 1 Cave has had guest hosts due to either Kreischer touring, or when Segura was injured in a basketball dunking challenge. Guest hosts include YMH team members Christina P and Dr. Drew, comedians Ryan Sickler, Tim Dillon, Whitney Cummings, Bobby Lee, and Kreischer's wife, LeeAnn. In November 2022 Quentin Tarantino guest hosted with Segura, where he criticized the Marvel Cinematic Universe for overshadowing movie stars.

Fandom
The show's format mostly consists of Segura and Pazsitzky talking about and commenting on various videos and clips which are acquired through YouTube, TikTok, fan submission, etc. Through this format, the hosts and the fans of the show commonly use quotes to create a lingo which is used throughout the podcast. Some common phrases from the show include: "high and tight", "cool guy", "cool guy club", "try it out", "good morning, Julia", "full throttle", "ta ta there, retard". Along with these quotations, Pazsitzky and Segura occasionally refer to each other as "Jeans" which stemmed from calling each other "mommy" and "mom jeans", and they refer fans of the show as "mommies" as a reference to the title of the show. It is common for fans of the show to use this lingo when referring to the show on social media.

Starting in 2019, fans of the show commonly posted comments on the Instagram page of singer/songwriter Garth Brooks, which was referred to as the "Garth Brooks Instagram Takeover", leading to a restriction of Segura's comments on Garth's Instagram page. The comments used the lingo of the show and commonly asked Brooks questions about where he was keeping the bodies. This line of questioning originated from Segura jokingly calling the singer "insane" and a "serial killer" in numerous episodes.

During a 2022 episode of 2 Bears 1 Cave with guest host Joe Rogan, Segura made jokes at the expense of Erie, Pennsylvania. Local weatherman David Wolter made jokes regarding Tom's basketball skills on a local new show, resulting in fans targeting Wolter and shaming him off social media. Segura challenged Wolter to a one-on-one game of basketball, which Wolter accepted.

Most episodes feature original music from fans that often incorporate samples from the videos played on the show.

References

External links

Tom Segura's website
Christina Pazsitzky's website

All Things Comedy
American comedy
Audio podcasts
Comedy and humor podcasts
2010 podcast debuts
American podcasts